Daqui Pro Futuro is an album released by the Brazilian rock band Pato Fu. It was released on August 10, 2007 and distributed by Tratore, began as the only independent album, Rotomusic. Along with their last album, it was still recorded by 128 Japs, John's studio at his house, the band made, recorded and mixed with several discs.

The studio 129 Japs is John's studio from his house. This album starred with a new integrity of the band, the keyboardist Lulu Camargo, ex-Karnak and used the producer that he took part.

Track listing

Personnel
 Fernanda Takai -  lead vocals, rhythm guitar
 John Ulhoa - lead guitar, vocals, violin; programming
 Ricardo Koctus - bass, vocals
 Xande Tamietti - drums
 Lulu Camargo - keyboards, piano

Special presentation
Andrea Echeverri from the Colombian band Aterciopelados with "Tudo Vai Ficar Bem"

Curiosities
The album was the first to be in digital format.
"Cities in Dust" is a recording of an original from the band Siouxsie and the Banshees
"A Hora da Estrela" is a song named after a book by Clarice Lispector.
A video Sorte Azar which features a montages with scenes from movies and photos from the old band, along with scenes from the video Pinga.
The video "Nada Original" (No Original) uses an old figurine from the video "Made in Japan" (Isopor) and is reused for the scene.

External links
Daqui Pro Futuro at Tratore
Album review by Marcelo Costa 
Reviews of the album by Gilberto Tenório 

2007 albums
Pato Fu albums